Matthew Lowe (born 30 March 1994) is a Bahamian swimmer. He competed in the men's 200 metre freestyle event at the 2017 World Aquatics Championships.

References

1994 births
Living people
Bahamian male freestyle swimmers
Place of birth missing (living people)